WWHL may refer to:

 WWHL-LD, a low-power television station (channel 31, virtual 32) licensed to serve Nashville, Tennessee, United States
 Western Women's Hockey League
 Watch What Happens Live with Andy Cohen, an American late-night talk show